Cath Carroll is an EP by the rock band Unrest. It was released in 1993 on 4AD.

Track listing

Personnel
Adapted from the Isabel Bishop liner notes.

Unrest
Bridget Cross – bass guitar
Phil Krauth – drums
Mark Robinson – vocals, guitar

Production and additional personnel
Guy Fixsen – remixing (1)
Brian Paulson – production

Release history

References

External links
 

1993 EPs
4AD EPs
Albums produced by Brian Paulson
Unrest (band) albums